Dimitris Dimitriou (Greek: Δημήτρης Δημητρίου) is a Cypriot football manager. Besides Cyprus, he has managed in India.

Career

In 2016, he was appointed manager of AEZ Zakakiou.

In 2019, Dimitriou was appointed head coach of newly-promoted TRAU in the Indian I-League. He implemented stricter training and fitness sessions. However, despite helping the I-League debutants go from the relegation zone to third place courtesy of a four-match winning streak, he was fired in January 2020, with the club hinting at match-fixing.

After leaving TRAU, Dimitriou claimed that general secretary Phulen Meitei wanted to be coach so prayed that TRAU would lose. He also claimed that Meitei forced him to sign a contract with a clause that allowed Meitei to pick the lineup, and that the general secretary forced officials to leave without explanation. In response, Meitei stated that he was fired for "indiscipline and misconduct". 

In 2020, he was appointed manager of Podosfairikos Omilos Xylotymbou 2006.

References

Living people
Cypriot football managers
Cypriot footballers
Year of birth missing (living people)
TRAU FC managers
I-League managers
Association footballers not categorized by position
Cypriot expatriate sportspeople in India
Cypriot expatriate football managers
Expatriate football managers in India